The Busan Port Authority is the governing body of the South Korean port of Busan. They are responsible for the maritime and seaport trade and is the leading seaport in the country.

See also
Pusan Newport International Terminal

References
Official website 

Port authorities
Transport in Busan
Water transport in South Korea